The second and final season of the American animated television series Gravity Falls began on August 1, 2014 on Disney Channel and on August 4, 2014 on Disney XD, and ended on February 15, 2016.

Development

Plot 
The second season continues right where the first season left off. The first 12 episodes mainly focus on Dipper, Mabel, Soos, and Wendy working on discovering the identity of the author of the journals, while Stan Pines continues to work on operating the mysterious portal beneath the Mystery Shack. The last eight episodes primarily focus on the gang trying to stop Bill Cipher, a dream demon with infinite power who wants to take over the world with weirdness, with J. K. Simmons joining the main cast as Ford Pines.

Production 
On July 29, 2013, the show was renewed for a second season. On February 16, 2014, it was announced that Gravity Falls would move from Disney Channel to Disney XD in Spring 2014, and that the second season would be shown on that channel. On March 4, 2014, Alex Hirsch announced on his Twitter account that the second season would premiere in Summer 2014. On June 14, 2014, it was confirmed that Season 2 would premiere on August 1, 2014 on Disney Channel and on August 4, 2014 on Disney XD. On the same day, it was announced that Season 2 would air on both Disney XD and Disney Channel. However, most of the new episodes would premiere on Disney XD before Disney Channel. It was announced that the second season will consist of 20 to 22 episodes.

On November 20, 2015, creator of the show Alex Hirsch announced that the second season would be the show's last and that it was his decision to end the show, not the network's.

Cast 
The main characters, voiced by Jason Ritter as Dipper, and Kristen Schaal as Mabel, with series creator Alex Hirsch portraying Grunkle Stan and Soos, and Wendy Corduroy played by Linda Cardellini, reprise their roles. Hirsch also voices Bill Cipher, who returns in the fourth episode, "Sock Opera". J. K. Simmons plays Stan's twin brother, Stanford Fillbrick "Ford" Pines, starting with the twelfth episode, "A Tale of Two Stans".

The recurring characters comprises the voices of Dee Bradley Baker as Mabel's pet pig, Waddles, and Hirsch also playing Old Man McGucket, the "local kook" of the town. Kevin Michael Richardson plays Sheriff Blubs, with partner Deputy Durland being voiced by Keith Ferguson. Pacifica Northwest is played by Jackie Buscarino. T. J. Miller plays as Robbie Valentino. Frank Welker voices Gompers, a goat who lives in the forest of Gravity Falls. Thurop Van Orman voices the recurring villain Li'l Gideon. Voice acting veteran John DiMaggio plays Manly Dan, a strong lumberjack and father of Wendy. Niki Yang and Carl Faruolo play Candy Chiu and Grenda, Mabel's two best friends, respectively. Toby Determined, a journalist for Gravity Falls' Gossiper, is voiced by Gregg Turkington, and Will Forte plays Tyler Cutebiker.

Broadcast
For this season, the show broadcast most of its original episodes on Disney XD, with Disney Channel airing reruns, although "Scary-oke" and "Little Gift Shop of Horrors" aired on Disney Channel first.
The season premiered on Disney Channel Europe, Middle East and Africa on December 3, 2014. It also airs on Disney XD Canada with differently assigned numbers: "Northwest Mansion Mystery" is counted 11 instead of 10, "Not What He Seems" is counted 10 instead of 11, "The Last Mabelcorn" is counted 17 instead of 15, "Dipper and Mabel vs. the Future" is counted 16 instead of 17, and "Weirdmageddon 3" is counted 24 instead of 20.

Episodes 
 Production codes for this season start with the string 618G-2 (the first three numbers numerically represent the birth month and date of series creator Alex Hirsch), with the last two numbers representing the order the episodes were produced in, which may not represent the order in which they air.
 The viewership of the episodes are given from the channel in which aired the episode first.
 Episode 10 has been released on different platforms under two names: "Northwest Mansion Mystery" and "Northwest Mansion Noir".

Critical reception
The season received wide acclaim from critics.

Notes

References

2014 American television seasons
2015 American television seasons
2016 American television seasons
Gravity Falls seasons